Mortonagrion varralli, the brown dartlet, is a species of damselfly in the family Coenagrionidae, endemic to India. The insect is named after Frederic Charles Fraser's wife, Ethel Grace Fraser (née Varrall) (1881-1960), a constant companion of his collecting trips in India.

Description and habitat
It is a small damselfly with ground-colour head and brown capped grey eyes. Its thorax is pale brown with a narrow antehumeral pale blue stripe, followed by pale blue at base. Abdomen is reddish-brown; 8th segment has a broader pale sky-blue basal annule which extends apically on each side. Female is similar to the male.

The species is commonly found at sea-level or on the foothills of the Western Ghats. Similarly to species in the genus Copera, it prefers the dense undergrowth.

See also 
 List of odonates of India
 List of odonata of Kerala

References

External links 

Coenagrionidae
Insects described in 1920